Eugène Aujaleu (29 October 1903, Nègrepelisse, Tarn-et-Garonne - 26 August 1990, Gambais, Yvelines) is a French doctor and public health official. He was the first Director General of Health from 1956 to 1964, then the first Director General of the National Institute of Health and Medical Research (INSERM) from 1964 to 1969.

Biography 
Eugène Aujaleu was born on 29 October 1903 in Nègrepelisse. Aujaleu studied medicine at the Faculty of Medicine of Toulouse (thesis in 1928). He turned to the field of infectiology. He became an associate professor at the Hôpital du Val-de-Grâce in 1936, where he directed the chair of epidemiology as well as the phtisiology department of the Percy military hospital. During the Second World War, he took over the management of the hygiene and epidemiology services of the French Armed Forces and then, in 1941, was appointed Inspector General of Public Health. Present by chance in Algiers when the allied troops arrived in 1942, he joined them and became the civilian health officer for the liberated territories. He took on new responsibilities in the field of public health with the French Committee of National Liberation. Upon release, he was appointed director of social hygiene at the Ministry of Public Health and Population.
 
In 1956, he was the first Director General of Health, a position in which he would be one of the great architects, with Robert Debré, of the reform of medical studies, the health system, and the creation of CHUs (university hospital centres). He plays a major role in reforming public psychiatry through the circular of 15 March 1960.
 
When INSERM was created, an offshoot of the National Institute of Hygiene headed by Louis Bugnard, he took over its first management in 1964 and laid all the foundations for the administrative operation and the objectives of the new institute which turned no longer just towards prevention and statistical studies, but now essentially towards research in biology and medicine. He left his post in 1969 and was replaced by Constant Burg.
 
Eugène Aujaleu ended his career as State Councillor and representative of France at the World Health Organization until 1982.

Personal life and death 
In 1937 he married Nadine Blanche Dumas. There were two daughters of the marriage. He died on 26 August 1990.

Prizes and Honours 
 
 Léon Bernard Foundation Prize (WHO) in 1971
 Grand Officer of the Legion of Honor
 Grand Cross of the National Order of Merit
 Commander of the Order of the Crown

References 
 

Recipients of the Order of the Crown (Belgium)
Recipients of the Ordre national du Mérite
Léon Bernard Foundation Prize laureates
Recipients of the Legion of Honour
1903 births
1990 deaths
University of Toulouse alumni
French physicians